Liar Game is a 2014 South Korean television series based on the Japanese manga of the same title by Shinobu Kaitani. Starring Kim So-eun, Lee Sang-yoon, and Shin Sung-rok, it aired on tvN from October 20 to November 18, 2014 on Mondays and Tuesdays at 23:00 (KST) time slot for 12 episodes.

Synopsis
Tempted by the chance to pay off her debts, Da-jung joins the game and gets conned out of the initial money given to her. In desperation, she asks genius ex-con swindler and former psychology professor Ha Woo-jin (Lee Sang-yoon) to help her win the game.

Cast

Main
 Kim So-eun as Nam Da-jung
 Lee Sang-yoon as Ha Woo-jin
 Shin Sung-rok as Kang Do-young

Supporting
 Choi Yoon-so as Goo Ja-young
 Kim Young-ae as Woo-jin's mother
 Jo Jae-yoon as Jo Dal-gu
 Um Hyo-sup as Da-jung's father
 Kang Min-kyung as Sung-ja
 Cha Soo-yeon as Lee Yoon-joo
 Choi Jin-ho as Director Jang 
 Kim Ik-tae as Hyun Jung-beom
 Lee El as Oh Jung-ah / Jamie
 Jang Seung-jo as Kim Bong-geun
 Lee Si-hoo as Choi Sung-joon
 Lee Kyu-bok as President Bae
 Lee Jun-hyeok as Criminal (ep. 1)
 Lee Cheol-min as Bulldog
 Lee Hae-yeong as Lawyer
 Park Ho-san as detective

Other
This drama is a remake of the original Liar Game manga, it is not a remake of the Japanese drama. This drama only has the original manga's copyright.

References

External links
 Liar Game official tvN website 
 
 
 Manga-Based Dramas Are Not Always A Formula For Success - KDrama Stars

2014 South Korean television series debuts
2014 South Korean television series endings
TVN (South Korean TV channel) television dramas
Liar Game
South Korean television dramas based on manga
South Korean thriller television series
South Korean mystery television series